Zigman is a surname of Yiddish origin and a variant spelling of Siegman. Notable people with the surname include:

Aaron Zigman (born 1963), American composer, producer, arranger, songwriter, and musician
Laura Zigman, American novelist and journalist

See also
 Zigmas

Jewish surnames